The black-banded sea krait (Laticauda semifasciata), also known commonly as the Chinese sea snake or erabu, is a species of venomous snake in the subfamily Laticaudinae of the family Elapidae. In Japan it is known as erabu umi hebi (:ja:エラブウミヘビ), and in Okinawa as the irabu.  It is found in much of the western Pacific Ocean.

This sea snake frequents coral reef areas. It has a short head, thick trunk, and no easily discernible neck. The tail is simply extended skin, spread wide like a fin, and unsupported by any bony projections from the vertebral column. The stomach is comparatively wide. Massing together near the shore, it breeds between narrow cracks in the reef and in caves.  It is a nocturnal snake, rarely seen during the day.  It breathes air; so it breaks the surface at least once every six hours.

Too slow to chase fish in open water, it hunts for fish by hiding in the coral reefs. Alternately, the black-banded sea krait is known to form hunting alliances with  bluefin trevally, flushing potential prey from narrow crannies in a reef the same way some moray eels do. The bite is highly venomous and paralyzes the prey. Females lay their eggs on land.

Generally, the species is found in Ryukyu Islands, Taiwan, the Philippines, and Indonesia. Its venom is ten times stronger than that of a cobra. The snake does not attack humans unless it feels threatened or provoked.

The erabu snake is a winter staple in southern Japan, where it is believed to replenish a female's womanhood. Irabu soup irabu-jiru (:ja:イラブー汁) is said to taste like miso and a bit like tuna. This soup was a part of the royal court cuisine of Ryukyu Kingdom; it is thought to have analeptic properties.

Development
Females lay 3–7 eggs that hatch after 4–5 months.

Location
The black-banded sea krait can be found in the warm waters of the western Pacific Ocean. However, researchers have recently found L. semifasciata in the waters surrounding southern South Korea. This area is located outside its "typical distribution range (Japan, China including Taiwan, Philippines and Indonesia)." The same researchers state that the black-banded sea krait has been dispersing northward from its typical distribution range due to climate change which has caused deterioration of its habitat.

References

Further reading
Schlegel H (1837). Essai sur la Physionomie des Serpens [Volume 2]. Partie Descriptive. Amsterdam: M. H. Schonekat. 606 + xv pp. (Platurus semifasciatus Reinwardt, new species, p. 516). (in French).

Laticauda
Reptiles of China
Reptiles of Indonesia
Reptiles of Japan
Reptiles of the Philippines
Reptiles of Taiwan
Reptiles described in 1837